Mukteshvara is an aspect of the Hindu god Shiva. Several Shiva temples are known by this name:

 Mukteshvara Temple, Bhubaneswar
 Mukteshvara Temple, Chaudayyadanapura
 Muktesvara Temple, Kanchipuram